Sha Qinglin (May 7, 1930 – February 23, 2020) was a Chinese highway engineer and academician of the Chinese Academy of Engineering (CAE).

Biography
Sha was born in Yixing, Jiangsu, on May 7, 1930. He joined the Communist Party of China in June 1951. In 1952 he graduated from Shanghai Jiao Tong University. After returning to China he worked in the Research Institute of Highway, Ministry of Transport. He died of illness in Beijing, on February 23, 2020, aged 89.

Honours and awards
 1995 Member of the Chinese Academy of Engineering (CAE)

References

1930 births
2020 deaths
People from Yixing
Engineers from Jiangsu
National Chiao Tung University (Shanghai) alumni
Members of the Chinese Academy of Engineering